Bruno Poromaa (10 May 1936 – 11 September 2016) was a Swedish politician. He was a member of the Riksdag from 1982 to 1994, stepping down to become commissioner of Kiruna Municipality. Poromaa retired in 1998, and died in 2016 at the age of 80.

References

External links
Bruno Poromaa profile (Riksdag)

1936 births
2016 deaths
Members of the Riksdag 1982–1985
Members of the Riksdag 1985–1988
Members of the Riksdag 1988–1991
Members of the Riksdag 1991–1994
Members of the Riksdag from the Social Democrats